Nora Miao (born Chan Wing-man; 8 February 1952) is a Hong Kong film actress. She is best known for appearing in many kung fu films in the 1970s, opposite Hong Kong action movie stars such as Bruce Lee and Jackie Chan.

Background
Chan Wing-man was born in British Hong Kong. She attended St. Teresa's School Kowloon. She was contracted to Golden Harvest, and spent her time making films in Hong Kong and in Taiwan, where she starred in several romance movies.

Miao worked well with Ko Chun-hsiung and was paired with him in several movies. She played opposite both Bruce Lee and Jackie Chan.  Miao appeared in all three of Bruce Lee's Hong Kong films, and became the only actress to share an on-screen kiss with Lee in Fist of Fury. She also starred opposite Jackie Chan in his first major film, New Fist of Fury.

She retired from acting in the late 1980s, and during the 1990s hosted an evening television show for the CFMT channel in Toronto.

Nora Miao currently lives in Toronto and hosts a radio program, "Coffee Talk", on CCBC Radio.

Filmography
Actress

 The Invincible Eight (1971) - Chiang Yin
 The Blade Spares None (1971) - Ho Li Chun
 The Comet Strikes (1971)
 The Big Boss (1971) - ice drinks hawker
 Story of Daisy (1972)
 Fist of Fury (1972) - Yuan Li Er
 Way of the Dragon (1972) - Cheng Ching Hua
 The Hurricane (1972) - Ms Ting
 Tokyo-Seoul-Bangkok Drug Triangle　(1973) - Parinda
 The Devil's Treasure (1973) - Yen Yen
 Naughty! Naughty! (1974) - Hsiao Yen
 The Skyhawk (1974) - Hsiang Lan
 Money Is Everything (1975)
 The Changing Clouds (1975)
 Bruce's Deadly Fingers (1976) - Mina Lo
 New Fist of Fury (1976) - Mao Li Er / Miss Lee
 The Obsessed (1976)
 To Kill a Jaguar (1977) - Bobo Kam
 Clans of Intrigue (1977) - Kung Nan Yen
 Men of the Hour (1977)
 The Kung Fu Kid (1977)
 Snake and Crane Arts of Shaolin (1978) - Tang Ping-Er
 Showdown at the Equator (1978)
 The Dream Sword (1979) - Tzu Yi Chun
 The Handcuff (1979)
 Dragon Fist (1979) - Zhuang Meng Lan
 Mask of Vengeance (1980)
 Sakyamuni Buddha (1980)
 The Last Duel (1981) - Shao Ye
 The Flower, the Killer (1981)
 Beauty Escort (1981) - Cold Blooded Mistress, Mei Win Shu
 My Blade, My Life (1982) - Zither Player
 Toronto Banana Gal (1990)
 How to Meet the Lucky Stars (1996)
 Run Papa Run (2008) - Auntie Ying
 Merry-Go-Round (2010) - Eva
 Vulgaria (2012) - Miss Cheung
 Never Too Late (2017)
 I'm Livin' It (2019) - Lai Fung

Cameo
 Bruce Lee : The Man and the Legend (1973)
 Bruce Lee, The Legend (1976)
 Bruce Lee: A Warrior's Journey (2000)
 Heart and Greed (溏心風暴3) (2017)

References

External links

Hong Kong Movie World Biography
Nora Miao's myspace.com fanpage
Fairchild Radio DJ Profile
HKMDB-Nora Miao Ke-Hsiu  ♀
Hong Kong Cinemagic-Nora Miao Ke Hsiu
2018 interview: Remembering Bruce Lee

1952 births
Living people
Cantonese people
Hong Kong film actresses
Hong Kong radio presenters
Hong Kong women radio presenters
Hong Kong television presenters
Hong Kong women television presenters